Bleich is a surname. Notable people with the surname include:

 Anet Bleich (born 1951), Dutch journalist
 E. Joseph Bleich (born 1950), Louisiana Supreme Court justice
 Jeff Bleich (born 1961), US Ambassador to Australia from 2009 till 2013
 Jeremy Bleich (born 1987), American-Israeli professional baseball relief pitcher
 J. David Bleich (born 1936), American rabbi and authority on Jewish law and ethics
 Judith Bleich (born 1938), professor of Judaic studies at Touro College in Manhattan
 Yaakov Bleich (born 1964), US-Ukrainian rabbi

See also 
 Bloch
 Blech
 Blick
 Blieck

References

German-language surnames
Jewish surnames
Yiddish-language surnames